Sowebo (South West Baltimore) is a community-chosen name for a historic area in the South West of Baltimore City.

Sowebo encompasses the neighborhoods of Union Square and Hollins Market, Baltimore. At one point, the area suffered from decades of urban decay but, in recent years, this community has seen increasing gentrification. On its main thoroughfares, West Lombard Street, Hollins Street, West Baltimore Street and South Carey Streets, spacious three-story row houses predominate. Most are pre- and post-Civil War Italianate in style, but there are many examples of Early Victorian Greek Revival and Late Victorian Romanesque Revival . A majority of these homes have ten- to fourteen-foot ceilings, tall distinctive windows, wood floors, and plaster walls. Exteriors are brick and mortar facades with cornices and marble steps. On side streets and alley streets (which are common in Baltimore) a variety of two-story and two-story-with-attic rowhouses are found.

An uncommon synergy prevails in Sowebo as residents, both longtime and newly arrived, work together through various committees and forums to enhance the area's quality of life . An annual arts festival, called the Sowebohemian Arts Festival, is held in the streets around Hollins Market on the Sunday afternoon of the Memorial Day weekend.

The University of Maryland's BioPark is a recent addition, with portions still under construction. The state-of-the-art facility contrasts greatly with historic Sowebo, which is listed on the National Register of Historic Places (The Union Square/Hollins Market District ), as is the H.L. Mencken house , which is located in the neighborhood at 1524 Hollins Street.

Photographer Martha Cooper moved back to her hometown of Baltimore in 2006 and bought a home close to Hollins Market from the artist John Ellsberry where she has become the unofficial "community photographer" for Sowebo. She launched her project with $3,300 of state funds granted through the nonprofit housing organization Southwest Visions. The photo project, with or without more funding, could continue for the rest of her working life, she says.

External links
 Hollins Roundhouse Online
 Union Square Online
 Sowebo Arts Inc.
 The SoWeBo Festival image collection at the Internet Archive

Gentrification in the United States
Neighborhoods in Baltimore